Virginia Ryan is an Australian actor who played the recurring character of Kayla Thomas in the Australian soap opera Neighbours. She also played Trish Jenkins in the Australian-New Zealand children's show, Holly's Heroes.

References

External links

Son CV de 2010 
Holly Héros: Juliette
Grand-Galop: Véronica *3
The Worst Witch: Éthel Hallow 3
Downton Abbey:

Australian soap opera actresses
Year of birth missing (living people)
Living people